Wayne Anthony Dowell (born 28 December 1973) is an English former professional footballer who played as a left back. He played in the Football League for Burnley, Carlisle United, Rochdale and Doncaster Rovers.

References

Sportspeople from Easington, County Durham
Footballers from County Durham
English footballers
Association football defenders
Burnley F.C. players
Carlisle United F.C. players
Rochdale A.F.C. players
Doncaster Rovers F.C. players
Northwich Victoria F.C. players
Accrington Stanley F.C. players
Barrow A.F.C. players
English Football League players
National League (English football) players
1973 births
Living people